Anian II (Anian Schonaw) was Bishop of the Diocese of St Asaph between 1268 and 1293. On his death in 1293 he was succeeded by Llywelyn de Bromfield.

References 

13th-century Roman Catholic bishops in Wales
Bishops of St Asaph
Welsh bishops
13th-century Welsh clergy